Two Boys Blowing Bubbles is a painting by the seventeenth-century Walloon artist Michaelina Wautier. It has been suggested that the painting is a double portrait, given the specific facial expressions and costumes of the two boys depicted are so distinctive. Besides the two boys, the painting depicts a candle and a sandtimer. As with the bubble, both are symbolic of the passing of time, and were familiar motifs in seventeenth-century painting. 

The painting was previously attributed to Jacob van Oost. However, research done in 2007 led to the re-attribution to Wautier.

The painting hangs in the Seattle Art Museum who purchased it in 1958. A second version by Wautier is in a private collection in Spain. A third painting, executed in the eighteenth century and copying just the boy on the right, is in the Collection des Musee d'Amiens, France.

References

Paintings by Michaelina Wautier
1600s paintings
Seattle Art Museum